is Japanese actress and former member of Japanese idol groups AKB48 and NMB48. She is known for her "Fresh Lemon" character and is the Hiroshima Lemon Ambassador since 2014.

Biography 
Ichikawa debuted in the entertainment industry under Stardust Promotion in 2005, as a member of the idol group "Power Age".  After parting from the group during April 2006, she transferred over to Box Corporation, and in 2008, she became one of Office Fukuta's models.

In March 2010, Ichikawa passed AKB48's tenth generation audition, consequently becoming one of several research student candidates—and later, on June 12, a full research student—under AKS. On June 19, she made her debut in the theatre as Yuka Masuda's understudy during AKB48 Team B's "Theatre no Megami". Alongside nine other research students, Ichikawa was appointed for the “Kaspersky Lab Internet Security 2011“‘s promotion in “AKB48 Kaspersky Laboratory” on September 7, which would then be led by fellow group member Atsuko Maeda. On March 10, 2011, she became part of a collaborated unit funded by the magazine Young Jump, "YJ7".

Ichikawa was promoted to a full member of AKB48 on May 29 of 2011, during a handshake event at Yokohama Stadium for "Everyday, Kachuusha!". Only days later, in the midst of “‘Minogashita Kimitachi e’ 〜AKB48 Group Performances〜” in Tokyo Dome City Hall on June 6th, the formation of Team 4 was announced alongside their first performance, a revival of Himawarigumi’s first stage, “Boku no Taiyou”—with Ichikawa being amongst the ten founding members. She ranked number 39 with 4,928 votes in AKB48’s 22nd Single General Election, thereby becoming a part of the Under Girls.

Ichikawa is known for her "Fresh Lemon" character, which includes her preference for clothing with lemon motifs and her signature catchphrase, "I want to be a fresh lemon".

On March 25 of 2012, during the third day of “Tanomuzo, Katayama Buchou! in Saitama Super Arena”, it was announced that Ichikawa would switch agencies from AKS to Production Ogi. On May 23, she debuted in senbatsu with AKB48's 26th single, "Manatsu no Sounds Good!", and in the following month, she ranked number 58 in the 27th Single's General Election, landing a position in Future Girls with 5,963 votes. After four months, her transition from AKS to Production Ogi was finally completed by July.

During the opening night of “AKB48 in TOKYO DOME 〜1830m no Kawa〜” on August 24, it was revealed that Team 4 would be disbanded; Ichikawa would, instead, transfer to Team B. She began her activities under the newly reformed Team B on November 1, and performed as part of the starting lineup for their waiting stage on the 3rd. On March 13, 2013 Ichikawa was cast as the Vocaloid Kagamine Rin in "Senbonzakura: The Musical", a play based on the song composed by Kurousa-P.

Alongside her position in Team B, she gained a concurrency with NMB48's Team N on November 3, leading to her first original unit song entitled "Onew no Uwabaki" during Team N's first original stage, N3 "Koko ni Datte Tenshi wa Iru"—which began on November 19. During that same year, she ranked 57th in AKB48's 32nd Single General Election with 12,616 votes.

On February 24, 2014, Ichikawa was transferred permanently to NMB48's Team BII. On March, she was appointed the Lemon Ambassador for Hiroshima Prefecture.

On January 19, 2018, Ichikawa announced her graduation. Her graduation ceremony was held on April 3, 2018, had her final handshake on April 30, 2018 and graduated on May 1, 2018.

Discography

AKB48

NMB48

Appearances

Stage units 
Team Kenkyuusei Stage 
 
 
Team B 5th Stage 
  
  (Yuka Masuda's Understudy)
Team K 6th Stage "RESET"
  
  (Minami Minegishi's Understudy)
Team A 6th Stage 
  
  (Aika Oota's Understudy)
Team 4 1st Stage 
 
Team B Waiting Stage 
 
Team N 1st Stage 
 
Team N 3rd Stage

Movie 
  (2008)
  (2012) - Tachibana Nanami

Drama 
  (2011) - Lemon
  (2011) - Amagasaki Kanna
  (2012) - Herself
  (2012) - Sudachi
  (2015) - Lemon

Variety 
  (2010–2011)
 AKBingo! (2011- )
  (2011)
  (2011)
  (2011)
  (2011)
  (2011–2012)
  (2011–2012)
  (2012)
  (2012- )
  (2013)
  (2014)
  (2014– )

Radio 
  (2011–present, CBC Radio)
  (2013–present, JOQR-AM)

Musical 
  (2013, Ginza Hakuhinkan Theatre) - Kagamine Rin

References

External links
 NMB48 Profile
 Production Ogi Profile
 Ichikawa Miori's Official Blog: "Tomorrow, I'll Become a Lemon!"
 Ichikawa Miori on Google+
 Ichikawa Miori on  Twitter

AKB48 members
NMB48 members
Japanese idols
Japanese women pop singers
1994 births
Living people
Musicians from Saitama Prefecture
21st-century Japanese women singers
21st-century Japanese singers
21st-century Japanese actresses
Stardust Promotion artists